The Department of Algiers is a former French department in Algeria. The department of Alger existed between 1848 and 1974.

The origin of the administrative divisions
Considered as a French province, Algeria was departmentalised on 9 December 1848, thereby operating according to the same administrative structure as metropolitan France. Three civil zones (départements) replaced the three beyliks into which the Ottoman former rulers had divided the territory. The principal town of the central département, also called Alger, became the prefecture of the eponymous département. The two other Algerian departments were Oran in the west and Constantine in the east.

Size and structure of the département

It was not until the 1950s that the Sahara was annexed into departmentalised Algeria, which explains why the département of Alger was limited to what is the north-central part of Algeria today. Until 10 January 1957, when the Sahara regions received their own administrative structure, these territories were administered by the département of Alger.

Religious affiliations
The 1954 census recorded the stated religious affiliations of the population. The majority in the département of Alger declared themselves to be Moslems. In the city of Alger itself, however, 296,041 or 46% of the 645,479 people counted were declared to be non-Moslems. This placed Alger second only to the city of Oran in terms of the proportion of the population stating that they were non-Moslems. Non-Moslem appears to have been seen as a surrogate description for people of European origin, or for Algerian Jews.

Reorganisation and independence

On 26 January 1956 population increases triggered the creation of three new stand-alone departments.

The very much truncated département of Alger now covered just 3,393 km², and was home to a population of 1,079,806. It was subdivided into the two sub-prefectures of Blida and Maison-Blanche (modern Dar El Beïda).

The 1957 departmental reorganisation was marked by a change in the "suffix" number appearing on automobile license plates and in other places that used the same code. Until 1957 Alger was department number "91": after 1957 the much diminished département of Alger became department number "9A". (In 1968, under a law enacted in 1964, the number "91" would be reallocated to a new département comprising the southern suburbs of Paris.)

After independence the department continued to exist until 1974 when it was split into Alger Province and Blida Province.

People 
 Mohamed Deriche (1865-1948), Algerian politician ;
 Mohamed Seghir Boushaki (1869-1959), Algerian politician ;
 Lyès Deriche, 20th-century leader of the Algerian national political movement against the French.

See also
.

References 

Former departments of France in Algeria
States and territories established in 1848
History of Algiers
1848 establishments in Algeria
1962 disestablishments in Algeria